Youraj Singh (born 9 April 1968 in Hyderabad, Andhra Pradesh) is former Indian cricketer who played for Hyderabad cricket team from 1992/93 to 1999/00 in 64 first-class and 25 List A matches.

He was a wicket-keeper who was able to bat in lower order with batting average of 15.94 in first-class and 24.18 in List A matches.

References

External links
 
 cricketarchive

1968 births
Living people
Indian cricketers
Hyderabad cricketers
Cricketers from Hyderabad, India
Wicket-keepers